Grybauskas is a Lithuanian language family name. It may refer to:
Paulius Grybauskas, Lithuanina footballer
Dalia Grybauskaitė, President of Lithuania

 
Lithuanian-language surnames